Sverre Sørsdal (5 August 1900 – 21 March 1996) was a  Norwegian boxer who competed in the 1920 Summer Olympics, in the 1924 Summer Olympics, and in the 1928 Summer Olympics.

Sørsdal was born in Hamar, Norway. He  trained as a medical student while pursuing his boxing career, boxing for Akademisk Boxe-Klub. As a doctor he later attained the position of head of department at Vardø Hospital in Finnmark. He was awarded the King's Medal of Merit (Kongens fortjenstmedalje) upon his retirement.

In 1920 he won the silver medal in the light heavyweight class after losing in the final to Eddie Eagan. Four years later he won the bronze medal in the same weight division when he won the bronze medal bout against Carlo Saraudi. In the 1928 Summer Olympics he finished fourth in the heavyweight competition. He was unable to compete in the bronze medal bout against Michael Michaelsen, after losing in the semifinal to Nils Ramm.

References

1900 births
1996 deaths
Light-heavyweight boxers
Heavyweight boxers
Olympic boxers of Norway
Boxers at the 1920 Summer Olympics
Boxers at the 1924 Summer Olympics
Boxers at the 1928 Summer Olympics
Olympic bronze medalists for Norway
Olympic silver medalists for Norway
Olympic medalists in boxing
Norwegian male boxers
20th-century Norwegian physicians
Medalists at the 1924 Summer Olympics
Medalists at the 1920 Summer Olympics
Recipients of the King's Medal of Merit
Sportspeople from Hamar